The 1983 Dallas Open, also known by its sponsored name Paine Webber Classic, was a men's tennis tournament held in Dallas, Texas in the United States and played on outdoor hard courts. It was part of the 1983 Volvo Grand Prix. The tournament took place from September 12 through September 18, 1983. Fourth-seeded Andrés Gómez won the singles title.

Finals

Singles

 Andrés Gómez defeated  Brian Teacher 6–7, 6–1, 6–1
 It was Gómez's only title of the year and the 16th of his career.

Doubles

 Nduka Odizor /  Van Winitsky defeated  Steve Denton /  Sherwood Stewart 6–3, 7–5
 It was Odizor's 2nd title of the year and the 3rd of his career. It was Winitsky's only title of the year and the 12th of his career.

See also
 1983 Virginia Slims of Dallas

References

External links
 ITF tournament profile

Dallas Open